This is a list of Qualcomm Snapdragon systems on chips (SoC) made by Qualcomm for use in smartphones, tablets, laptops, 2-in-1 PCs, smartwatches, and smartbooks devices.

Before Snapdragon 
SoC made by Qualcomm before it was renamed to Snapdragon.

Snapdragon S series

Snapdragon S1 

Snapdragon S1 notable features over its predecessor (MSM7xxx):

 CPU features
 1 core up to 1 GHz Scorpion or Cortex-A5 or ARM11
 Up to 256K L2 cache
 Up to 32K+32K L1 cache
 GPU features
 Adreno 200 (From Software rendered or Adreno 130)
OpenGL ES 1.1
OpenVG 1.0
Direct3D Mobile
Unified shader model 5-way VLIW
 DSP features
 Hexagon QDSP5 at 350 MHz or Hexagon QDSP6 600 MHz
 ISP features
 Up to 12 MP camera
 Modem and wireless features
 External Bluetooth 4.0 or external Bluetooth 2.0/2.1 on some models
 45 or 65 nm manufacturing technology

Snapdragon S2 

Snapdragon S2 notable features over its predecessor (Snapdragon S1):

 CPU feature
 1 core up to 1.5 GHz Scorpion
ARMv7 (From ARMv6 on some model)
 Up to 384K L2
 GPU features
 Adreno 205 (From Software rendered or Adreno 200)
 Up to 266 MHz
Up to 2 times faster than Adreno 200
Up to x2 relative performance on OpenGL ES 2.0 from Adreno 200
Up to XGA
OpenGL ES 2.0
SVGT 1.2
OpenVG 1.1
Direct Draw
GDI
Concurrent CPU, DSP, graphics and MDP
Memory features
Up to LPDDR2 32 bit Dual-channel 333 MHz (5.3 GB/s)
 DSP features
 Hexagon QDSP5 at 256 MHz
45 nm manufacturing technology
904 pins

Snapdragon S3 

Snapdragon S3 notable features over its predecessor (Snapdragon S2):

 CPU feature
 2 cores up to 1.7 GHz Scorpion
 512KB L2
 GPU features
 Adreno 220
 Up to 4 time faster than Adreno 200
Up to x5 relative performance on OpenGL ES 2.0 from Adreno 200
EGL 1.3 (From 1.2)
2x Larger L2 cache (512 KB from 256 KB)
Up to WXGA+
DSP features
Hexagon QDSP6 at 400 MHz (From Hexagon QDSP5 at 256 MHz)
ISP features
Up to 16 MP camera (From 12 MP)
45 nm manufacturing technology

Snapdragon S4 

Snapdragon S4 is offered in three models; S4 Play for budget and entry-level devices, S4 Plus for mid-range devices and S4 Pro for high-end devices. It was launched in 2012.

The Snapdragon S4 were succeeded by Snapdragon 200/400 series (S4 Play) and 600/800 series (S4 Plus and S4 Pro)

Snapdragon S4 Play

Snapdragon S4 Plus

Snapdragon S4 plus notable features over its predecessor (Snapdragon S3):

 CPU features
2 cores up to 1.7 GHz Krait 200
4+4 KB L0, 16+16 KB L1, 1 MB L2
Out of Order Execution (From Partial Out of Order Execution on Scorpion)
GPU features
Adreno 225
Up to 1080p screen
Up to 6 time faster than Adreno 200
Up to 32 ALU
Direct3D feature level 9.0 (From 9.0)
Up to x7.5 relative performance on OpenGL ES 2.0 from Adreno 200
Adreno 305
Up to 1080p screen (on 400 MHz)
Up to 720p screen (on 320 MHz)
Up to 24 ALU (From 32 on S3)
Unified shader model Scalar instruction set (From Unified shader model 5-way VLIW)
Up to x8 relative performance on OpenGL ES 2.0 from Adreno 200
DSP features
Up to 20 MP or 13.5 MP camera
ISP features
Hexagon QDSP6
Modem and wireless features
Integrated Bluetooth 4.0
IZat Gen8A (From IZat Gen 7)
28 nm manufacturing technology

Snapdragon S4 Pro and Snapdragon S4 Prime (2012)

Snapdragon S4 Pro notable features over its predecessor (Snapdragon S4 Play):
 CPU features
up to 2 cores up to 1.7 GHz Krait 300 on to Snapdragon S4 Pro
up to 4 cores up to 1.5 GHz Krait 300 on to Snapdragon S4 Prime
4+4 KB L0, 16+16 KB L1, 1 MB L2
GPU features
 Adreno 320 
Support OpenGL ES 3.0
Up to 1080p screen
Up to 64 ALU (From 32 on S4 plus)
Up to x23 relative performance on OpenGL ES 2.0 from Adreno 200
DSP features
 Hexagon QDSP6
ISP features
 Up to 20 MP camera
Modem and wireless features
LTE FDD/TDD Cat 3 or external on some models
 28 nm LP manufacturing technology
Up to eMMC 4.4/4.4.1

Snapdragon 2 Series 

The Snapdragon 2 series is the entry-level SoC designed for low-end or ultra-budget smartphones. It replaces the MSM8225 S4 Play model as the lowest-end SoC in the entire Snapdragon lineup.

Snapdragon 200 (2013)

Qualcomm 205, Snapdragon 208, 210 and 212 (2014–17) 
The Snapdragon 208 and Snapdragon 210 were announced on September 9, 2014.
The Snapdragon 212 was announced on July 28, 2015.
The Qualcomm 205 Mobile Platform formally falls under the Mobile Platform brand, but is practically a Snapdragon 208 with a X5 LTE modem. It was announced March 20, 2017.

Qualcomm 215 (2019) 
The Qualcomm 215 was announced on July 9, 2019. It is a toned-down variant of the Snapdragon 425 and primarily optimized for Android Go Edition devices.

Snapdragon 4 Series 

The Snapdragon 4 Series is the entry-level SoC designed for the more upmarket entry-level segment, as opposed to the 2 Series, which were aimed at ultra-budget segment. Similar to the 2 Series, it is the successor of the S4 Play.

Snapdragon 400 (2013)

Snapdragon 410, 412 and 415 (2014/15) 
The Snapdragon 410 was announced on December 9, 2013. It was Qualcomm's first 64-bit mobile system on a chip and first manufactured in China by SMIC.
The Snapdragon 412 was announced on July 28, 2015.
The Snapdragon 415 and the older Snapdragon 425 (later cancelled) were announced on February 18, 2015.

Snapdragon 425, 427, 430 and 435 (2015/16) 
Snapdragon 425, 427, 430 and 435 are pin and software compatible; software compatible with Snapdragon 429, 439, 450, 625, 626 and 632.
The Snapdragon 430 was announced on September 15, 2015.
The new Snapdragon 425 and Snapdragon 435 were announced on February 11, 2016.
The Snapdragon 427 was announced on October 18, 2016.

Snapdragon 429, 439 and 450 (2017/18) 
The Snapdragon 450 was announced on June 28, 2017. Pin and software compatible with Snapdragon 625, 626 and 632; software compatible with Snapdragon 425, 427, 429, 430, 435 and 439.
The Snapdragon 429 and 439 were announced on June 26, 2018. Snapdragon 429 and 439 pin and software compatibility; software compatible with Snapdragon 425, 427, 430, 435, 450, 625, 626 and 632.

Snapdragon 460 (2020) 
The Snapdragon 460 was announced on 20 January 2020, with NavIC support. It is the first Snapdragon 400 model to incorporate the Kryo architecture.

Snapdragon 480/480+ 5G (2021) 
The Snapdragon 480 was announced on January 4, 2021, and is the first SoC in the Snapdragon 4-Series by Qualcomm to support 5G Connectivity.The Snapdragon 480+ was announced on October 26, 2021.

Snapdragon 4 Gen 1 (2022) 
The Snapdragon 4 Gen 1 was announced on September 6, 2022.

Snapdragon 6 Series 

The Snapdragon 6 Series is the mid-range SoC primarily targeted at both the entry-level and mid-range segments, succeeding the S4 Plus. It is the most commonly used Snapdragon lineup, appearing in mainstream devices of various manufacturers.

Snapdragon 600 (2013) 
The Snapdragon 600 was announced on January 8, 2013. Unlike the later models of the 600 series, Snapdragon 600 was considered a high-end SoC similar to the Snapdragon 800, and was the direct successor of both the Snapdragon S4 Plus and S4 Pro.
 Display Controller: MDP 4. 2 RGB planes, 2 VIG planes, 1080p

Snapdragon 610, 615 and 616 (2014/15) 

The Snapdragon 610 and Snapdragon 615 were announced on February 24, 2014. The Snapdragon 615 was Qualcomm's first octa-core SoC. Starting with the Snapdragon 610, the 600 series is a mid-range SoC lineup, as opposed to the original Snapdragon 600, which was a high-end model.
Hardware HEVC/H.265 decode acceleration
The Snapdragon 616 was announced on July 31, 2015.

Snapdragon 617, 625 and 626 (2015/16) 
The Snapdragon 617 was announced on September 15, 2015.
The Snapdragon 625 was announced on February 11, 2016.
The Snapdragon 626 was announced on October 18, 2016. Snapdragon 625, 626, 632 and 450 are pin and software compatible; software compatible with Snapdragon 425, 427, 429, 430, 435 and 439.

Snapdragon 650 (618), 652 (620) and 653 (2015/16) 
The Snapdragon 618 and Snapdragon 620 were announced on February 18, 2015. They have been since renamed as Snapdragon 650 and Snapdragon 652 respectively.
The Snapdragon 653 was announced on October 18, 2016.

Snapdragon 630, 636 and 660 (2017) 
Snapdragon 630, 636 and 660 are pin and software compatible.
The Snapdragon 630 and Snapdragon 660 were announced on May 8, 2017.
The Snapdragon 636 was announced on October 17, 2017.

Snapdragon 632 and 670 (2018) 
The Snapdragon 632 was announced on June 26, 2018.  Pin and software compatible with Snapdragon 625, 626 and 450; software compatible with Snapdragon 425, 427, 429, 430, 435 and 439.
The Snapdragon 670 was announced on August 8, 2018. Pin and software compatible with Snapdragon 710.

Snapdragon 662, 665, 675 and 678 (2019/20) 
The Snapdragon 675 was announced on October 22, 2018.
The Snapdragon 665 was announced on April 9, 2019.
The Snapdragon 662 was announced on January 20, 2020, with NavIC support.
The Snapdragon 678 was announced on December 15, 2020.

Snapdragon 680 4G, 690 5G and 695 5G (2020/21) 
The Snapdragon 690 was announced on June 16, 2020, and is the first midrange SoC by Qualcomm to support 5G connectivity.The Snapdragon 680 and 695 were announced on October 26, 2021.

Snapdragon 6 Gen 1 (2022) 
The Snapdragon 6 Gen 1 was announced on September 6, 2022.

Snapdragon 7 Series 

On February 27, 2018, Qualcomm Introduced the Snapdragon 7 Mobile Platform Series. It is an upper mid-range SoC designed to bridge the gap between the 6 series and the 8 series, and primarily aimed at premium mid-range segment.

Snapdragon 710 and 712 (2018/19) 
The Snapdragon 710 was announced on May 23, 2018. Pin and software compatible with Snapdragon 670.
The Snapdragon 712 was announced on February 6, 2019.

Snapdragon 720G/730/730G/732G (2019/20) 
The Snapdragon 730 and 730G were announced on April 9, 2019.
The Snapdragon 720G was announced on January 20, 2020.
 The Snapdragon 732G was announced on August 31, 2020.

Snapdragon 750G and 765/765G/768G 5G (2020) 
The Snapdragon 765 and 765G were announced on December 4, 2019 as Qualcomm's first SoCs with an integrated 5G modem, and the first 700 series SoCs to support updatable GPU Drivers via the Play Store.
The Snapdragon 768G was announced on May 10, 2020.
The Snapdragon 750G was announced on September 22, 2020.

Snapdragon 778G/778G+, 780G and 782G 5G (2021/22) 
The Snapdragon 780G was announced on March 25, 2021.
 The Snapdragon 778G was announced on May 19, 2021. The Snapdragon 778G+ was announced on October 26, 2021. The Snapdragon 782G was announced on November 22, 2022.

Snapdragon 7 Gen 1 (2022) 
The Snapdragon 7 Gen 1 was announced on May 20, 2022.

Snapdragon 7+ Gen 2 (2023) 
The Snapdragon 7+ Gen 2 was announced on March 17, 2023.

Snapdragon 8 Series 

The Snapdragon 8 Series is the high-end SoC and serves as Qualcomm's current flagship, succeeding the S4 Pro and the older S1/S2/S3 series.

Snapdragon 800, 801 and 805 (2013/14) 

The Snapdragon 800 was announced on January 8, 2013.

CPU features
4 cores up to 2.36 GHz Krait 400
4 KiB + 4 KiB L0 cache, 16 KiB + 16 KiB L1 cache and 2 MiB L2 cache
GPU features
Adreno 330 GPU
Up to 128 ALU (From 96 on Adreno 320)
Up to 1024 KB On-chip graphics memory (From 512 KB on Adreno 320)
Up to x30 relative performance on OpenGL ES 2.0 from Adreno 200
Support OpenGL ES 3.0 (Over 2.0 Adreno Adreno 225)
Unified shader model Scalar instruction set (from Unified shader model 5-way VLIW on 2xx Adreno series)
DSP features
H.264, VP8 UHD/30fps encoding/decoding (From 1080p60)
ISP features
Up to 21 megapixel, stereoscopic 3D 24dual image signal processor (supports HDRI)
Throughput: 0.64 GP/sec
Up to 320 MHz
Modem and wireless features
Wi-Fi 802.11ac wave 1 support
Gobi 4G (LTE Cat 4: download up to 150 Mbit/s, upload up to 50 Mbit/s), on some models
SOC features
eMMC 4.5 support
 USB 2.0 and 3.0
 Qualcomm Quick Charge 2.0
28 nm HPm (From 28 nm HP)
Up to 1 billion transistors
Die size: 118mm²

The Snapdragon 801 was announced on February 24, 2014.
Notable features:

CPU features
4 cores up to 2.45 GHz Krait 400
DSP features
H.265 HD/30fps software decoding
ISP features
Throughput: 1.0 GP/sec (From 0.64 GP/sec on S800)
Up to 465 MHz (From 320 MHz on S800)
eMMC 5.0 support (Up to 400MB/s)
DSDA

The Snapdragon 805 was announced on November 20, 2013.

 CPU features
4 cores up to 2.7 GHz Krait 450
Up to 128-bit wide LPDDR3 memory interface
GPU features
Adreno 420 GPU
 Up to 128 ALU
Hardware dynamic tessellation support
Support for hull, domain and geometry shaders
Update with new dedicated connection to the memory controller(From shared bus with the video decoder and ISP)
Up to 40% increase performance in shader hardware
1.5x larger L2 cache (1536 KB from 1024 KB)
Better anisotropic filtering support
Larger texture cache
Full support Direct3D Feature Level 11_2 and OpenCL 1.2
DSP features
Improve H.265 support : UHD/30fps hardware decoding
1080p 120fps encoding and decoding
ISP features
Up to 55 megapixel
Throughput: 1.0 GP/sec (From 0.64 GP/sec on SD800)
Modem and wireless features
External modem

Snapdragon 808 and 810 (2015) 

The Snapdragon 808 and 810 were announced on April 7, 2014.

Snapdragon 808 notable features over its predecessor (805):
 CPU features
ARMv8-A 64-bit architecture (with Global Task Scheduling)
2 + 4 cores (1.82 GHz Cortex-A57 + 1.44 GHz Cortex-A53)
Up to 48KB Data + 32KB Instr. L1 cache (From 16 KB + 16 KB)
GPU features
 Up to 128 ALU 
Adreno 418 GPU with support for Vulkan 1.0
Support OpenGL ES 3.1
Full support Direct3D Feature Level 11_2 and OpenCL 1.2
DSP features
 Hexagon V56 DSP
ISP features
 12-bit dual-ISP up to 21 MP
SOC features
2 billion transistor
Snapdragon 810 notable features over its lower end (808):
 CPU features
4 + 4 cores (2.0 GHz Cortex-A57 + 1.5 GHz Cortex-A53)
 GPU features
Adreno 430 GPU with support for Vulkan 1.0
Full support Direct3D Feature Level 11_2 and OpenCL 1.2
4K main display support
Up to 256 ALU (From 128 on Adreno 330)
 ISP features
14-bit dual-ISP up to 55 MP
Throughput: 1.2 GP/sec (From 1.0 GP/sec on SD805)
ISP is clocked at 600 MHz
DSP features
H.264, H.265 UHD/30fps encoding and decoding
Modem and wireless features
Snapdragon X10 LTE modem
Cat 9: download up to 450 Mbit/s
Upload up to 50 Mbit/s
Bluetooth 4.1
SOC features
20 nm manufacturing technology
2.5 billion transistor

Snapdragon 820 and 821 (2016) 
The Snapdragon 820 was announced at the Mobile World Congress in March 2015, with the first phones featuring the SoC released in early 2016. The Snapdragon 821 was announced in July 2016. The 821 provides a 10% improvement in performance over the 820 due to a faster clocked CPU, but otherwise has similar features, with Qualcomm stating that the 821 is designed to complement rather than replace the 820.

Notable features over its predecessor (Snapdragon 808 and 810):

CPU features
Custom Kryo quad-core CPU
Per Core : L1: 32+32 KB, L2: 2 MB + 1 MB
L3 cache shared between CPU cluster
 GPU features
Adreno 530 GPU with support for Vulkan 1.0
Less L2 GPU cache (1024 KB from 1536 KB)
DirectX 12, OpenCL 2.0, OpenGL ES 3.2
 DSP features
Hexagon 680 DSP 1st generation "AI engine"
Down to 2-3 time power consumption (From SD808)
New low power island (LPI) for sensor aware apps
Hexagon Vector eXtensions
All-Ways Aware Hub low power island
Neural Processing Engine (NPE)
Halide and TensorFlow support
H.264, H.265 UHD/30fps encoding
 H.264, H.265 10-bit, VP9 UHD/60fps decoding
ISP features
 Qualcomm Spectra ISP with Dual 14-bit ISPs
 28 MP at 30fps single camera; 25 MP at 30fps single camera with ZSL; 13 MP Dual Camera with ZSL
 Video Capture: Up to 4K Ultra HD HEVC video capture @ 30FPS
 Video Playback: Up to 4K Ultra HD 10-bit HEVC video playback @ 60FPS,  1080p@ 240 FPS
 Throughput: 1.2GP/sec (Same as 810)
Modem and wireless features
Snapdragon X12 LTE modem
Download: Cat 12 (up to 600 Mbit/s),  3x20 MHz CA; 64-QAM; 4x4 MIMO on 1C
Upload: Cat 13 (up to 150 Mbit/s), 2x20 MHz CA; 64-QAM
Support MIMO 4×4
802.11a/b/g/n/ac Wi-Fi connectivity
Wi-Fi ad support with external chip
SOC features
14 nm FinFET process
eMMC 5.1/UFS 2.0
Quick Charge 3.0
2.0 billion transistors
Max 8 GB LPDDR4 Quad-channel 16-bit (64-bit) 1866 MHz (29.8 GB/s)

The Snapdragon 821 was announced on August 16, 2016.

Notable features over its predecessor (Snapdragon 820):

 CPU features
 Faster CPU (+10%)
 GPU features
 Faster GPU 650Mhz from 624 (+5%)
 Snapdragon VR-SDK.
 ISP features
 Support Dual PD (PDAF).
 Extended laser Auto-focus.

Snapdragon 835 (2017) 

The Snapdragon 835 was announced on November 17, 2016.

Notable features over its predecessor (821).

 CPU features
Samsung 10nm FinFET Low-Power Early fabrication, 3 billion transistors
4 Kryo 280 Gold (ARM Cortex-A73 based)
L1 cache: 64 kB + 64 kB
L2 cache: 2 MB
 4 Kryo 280 Silver (ARM Cortex-A53 based)
LPDDR4X in dual-channel mode, up to 1866 MHz
 GPU features
Adreno 540 graphics with support for Vulkan 1.1, DirectX 12 (Feature level 12_1), OpenCL 2.0 and OpenGL ES 3.2
Quad-Core GPU @ 710/670 MHz with 384 ALUs, 16 TMUs and 12 ROPs
@ 710 MHz: 727.04 GFLOPs, 11.36 GTexels/s and 8.52 GPixels/s
@ 670 MHz: 686.08 GFLOPs, 10.72 GTexels/s and 8.04 GPixels/s
Qualcomm Q-Sync (Variable Refresh Rate) and Adreno Foveation (Foveated Rendering)
 DSP features
Hexagon 682 DSP 2nd generation "AI engine"
Hexagon Vector eXtensions
All-Ways Aware Hub low power island
Neural Processing Engine (NPE)
Halide and TensorFlow support
H.264, H.265, VP9 UHD/30fps encoding and UHD/60fps 10-bit decoding
High-dynamic-range video support(HDR10)/Ultra HD Premium (only Decoding)
DSD and 32-bit/384 kHz PCM audio support with WCD9341 codec
 ISP features:
Qualcomm Spectra 180 ISP with Dual 14-bit ISPs
 Single Camera, 30fps: Up to 32 MP
 32 MP at 30fps single camera; 25 MP at 30fps single camera with ZSL; 16 MP Dual Camera with ZSL
 Video Capture: Up to 4K Ultra HD video capture @ 30FPS
 Video Playback: Up to 4K Ultra HD video playback
 Codec Support: H.265 (HEVC), H.264 (AVC), VP9
Modem and wireless features
Snapdragon X16 LTE modem
Downlink: LTE Cat 16 up to 1 Gbit/s, 4x20 MHz carrier aggregation, up to 256-QAM
Uplink: LTE Cat 13 up to 150 Mbit/s, Qualcomm® Snapdragon Upload+ (2x20 MHz carrier aggregation, up to 64-QAM, uplink data compression)
802.11a/b/g/n/ac/ad Wi-Fi connectivity
Bluetooth 5.0 (From Bluetooth 4.1)
SOC features
10 nm FinFET LPE (Samsung)
Die size: 72.3mm²
3 billion Transistors
UFS 2.1, SD 3.0 (UHS-I)
DisplayPort, HDMI 2.0, USB Type-C 3.1 with USB Power Delivery
Qualcomm Quick Charge 4
Up to 8 GB LPDDR4X Dual-channel 32-bit (64-bit) 1866 MHz (29.8 GB/s)

Snapdragon 845 (2018) 
The Snapdragon 845 was announced on December 7, 2017.

Snapdragon 845's notable features:

 CPU features
Samsung 10nm FinFET Low-Power Plus fabrication
4 Kryo 385 Gold (ARM Cortex-A75 based)
L1 cache: 64 KB + 64 KB
L2 cache: 256 KB
4 Kryo 385 Silver (ARM Cortex-A55 based)
DynamIQ with 2 MiB L3 cache
3 MiB system-level cache for CPU, GPU, DSP...
 GPU features
Adreno 630 graphics with support for Vulkan 1.1, DirectX 12 (Feature level 12_1), OpenCL 2.0, OpenGL ES 3.2 and DxNext eXtended Reality (XR)
Dual-Core GPU @ 710 MHz with 512 ALUs, 24 TMUs and 16 ROPs  (up from 512 ALUs, 16 TMUs and 12 ROPs)
727.04 GFLOPs, 17.04 GTexels/s and 11.36 GPixels/s
Inside-out Room-Scale 6DoF with simultaneous localization and mapping (SLAM)
Advanced visual inertial odometry (VIO) And Adreno Foveation
Support for HDR10 and hybrid log–gamma (HLG)
DisplayPort, HDMI 2.0, USB Type-C 3.1 with USB Power Delivery
 DSP features
Hexagon 685 3rd generation "AI engine" with greater than 3 trillion operations per second (TOPS)
Hexagon Vector eXtensions
All-Ways Aware Hub low power island
Neural Processing Engine (NPE)
Caffe, Caffe2, Halide and TensorFlow support
Up to 4K Ultra HD @ 60 FPS (From 4K30 Encode), 2x 2400x2400 @ 120 FPS (VR)
Can record 240 FPS in 1080p and 480 FPS in 720p (Slow motion)
10-bit color depth (encoding and decoding) on H.264, H.265 and (decode only) VP9
BT.2020 support on DSP and GPU
ISP features:
Qualcomm Spectra 280 ISP with Dual 14-bit ISPs
192 MP single camera; 48 MP single camera with MFNR; 32 MP at 30fps single camera with MFNR/ZSL; 16 MP at 60fps single camera with MFNR/ZSL; 16 MP at 30fps Dual Camera with MFNR/ZSL
Modem and wireless features
Downlink: 5x20 MHz carrier aggregation, up to 256-QAM, up to 4x4 MIMO on three carriers
Uplink: 2x20 MHz carrier aggregation, up to 64-QAM
Bluetooth enhancements
Ultra-low power wireless earbuds
Direct audio and aptX HD quality stereo broadcast to multiple wireless speakers
Wi-Fi ad 60 GHz with external Module
Improve GPS support : Glonass, Beidou, Galileo, QZSS and SBAS
System on a chip features
10 nm FinFET LPP (Samsung)
Die size: 94 mm²
(5.3) billion Transistors
Secure Vault (SPU)
Native DSD support, PCM up to 384 kHz/32bit
Qualcomm Quick Charge 4+
Up to 8 GB LPDDR4X Quad-channel 16-bit (64-bit) 1866 MHz (29.9 GB/s)

Snapdragon 855/855+ (2019) and 860 (2021) 

The Snapdragon 855 was announced on December 5, 2018.
The Snapdragon 855 is Qualcomm's first 7 nm FinFET chipset.

Notable features over its predecessor (845):

 7 nm (N7 TSMC) process
Die size: 73 mm² (8.48 mm × 8.64 mm)
6.7 billion transistors
 Support up to 16 GB LPDDR4X 2133 MHz support
4x 16-bit memory bus, (34.13 GB/s) up to 16 GB
NVM Express 2x 3.0 (1x for external 5G modem)
CPU features
1 Kryo 485 Prime (Cortex-A76-based), up to 2.84 GHz. Prime core with 512 KB pL2
3 Kryo 485 Gold (Cortex-A76-based), up 2.42 GHz. Performance cores with 256 KB pL2 each
4 Kryo 485 Silver (Cortex-A55-based), up 1.8 GHz. Efficiency cores with 128 KB pL2 each
DynamIQ with 2 MB sL3 cache
3 MB system-level cache
GPU features
Adreno 640 GPU with support for Vulkan 1.1
Up to 768 ALU (From 512 on Adreno 630)
Tri-core GPU @ 585 MHz with 768 ALUs, 36 TMUs and 28 ROPs (up from 512 ALUs, 24 TMUs and 16 ROPs)
954.7 FP32 GFLOPs, 1853.3 FP16 GFLOPs, 28.1 bilinear GTexels/s, 9.4 GPixels/s and 300 GB/s effective memory bandwidth
HDR gaming (10-bit color depth, Rec. 2020)
120 fps gaming
Improvement on hardware-accelerated H.265 and VP9 decoder
HDR playback codec support for HDR10+, HDR10, HLG and Dolby Vision
Volumetric VR video playback
8K 360 VR video playback
Quarterly GPU driver updates via Google Play Store
Android GPU Inspector Tool
DSP features
Hexagon 690 4th generation "AI engine" with greater than 7 trillion operations per second (TOPS)
Qualcomm Hexagon Vector Accelerator with Hexagon Vector eXtensions
Qualcomm Hexagon Tensor Accelerator (HTA)
Qualcomm Hexagon Voice Assistant
All-Ways Aware Hub
Caffe, Caffe2, Halide and TensorFlow support
Vector/Scalar performance compared with Hexagon 680: doubled the HVX vector units and 20% increase in scalar performance
ISP features:
Qualcomm Spectra 380 with dual 14-bit CV-ISPs and hardware accelerator for computer vision
Multi-frame noise reduction
Hybrid AF
192 MP single camera; 48 MP at 30 fps single camera with MFNR/ZSL; 22 MP at 30 fps dual camera with MFNR/ZSL
HEIF photo capture support
Tri-core hardware CV functions including object detection & tracking, and stereo depth processing
Advanced HDR solution including improved zzHDR and 3-exposure Quad Color Filter Array (QCFA) HDR
4K 60 FPS HDR video with real-time object segmentation (portrait mode, background swap) features HDR10, HDR10+ and HLG with Portrait Mode (bokeh), 10-bit color depth and Rec. 2020 color gamut
Up to 1.32 Gpixel/s
 Video Capture Formats: HDR10, HLG
 Video Codec Support: H.265 (HEVC), H.264 (AVC), HLG, HDR10, HDR10+, VP8, VP9
Modem and wireless features:
Internal X24 LTE Modem
Download: 2000 Mbit/s DL (Cat. 20), 7x20 MHz CA, 256-QAM, 4x4 MIMO
Upload: 316 Mbit/s UL (Cat 20), 3x20 MHz CA, 256-QAM
External Snapdragon X50 (5G Modem): 5000 Mbit/s DL
Qualcomm Wi-Fi 6-ready mobile platform:
Wi-Fi Standards: 802.11ax-ready, 802.11ac Wave 2, 802.11a/b/g, 802.11n
Wi-Fi Spectral Bands: 2.4 GHz, 5 GHz• Channel Utilization: 20/40/80 MHz
MIMO Configuration: 2x2 (2-stream) • MU-MIMO• Dual-band simultaneous (DBS)
Key Features: 8x8 sounding (up to 2x improvement over 4x4 sounding devices), Target Wakeup Time for up to 67% better power efficiency, latest security with WPA3
Qualcomm 60 GHz Wi-Fi mobile platform
Wi-Fi Standards: 802.11ad, 802.11ay
Wi-Fi Spectral Band: 60 GHz
Peak speed: 10 Gbit/s

The Snapdragon 855+ was announced on July 15, 2019.

The Snapdragon 860 was announced on March 22, 2021.

Snapdragon 865/865+ 5G (2020) and 870 5G (2021) 
The Snapdragon 865 was announced on December 4, 2019.

Notable features over its predecessor (855):
 2nd generation 7 nm (N7P TSMC) process
10.3 billion transistors
83.54 mm2 (8.49 mm x 9.84 mm)
 Support up to 16 GB LPDDR5 2750 MHz or LPDDR4X 2133 MHz support
 4x 16-bit memory bus, (or 34.13 GB/s) up to 16 GB
 NVM Express 2x 3.0 (1x for external 5G modem)
Support Quick charge 4+
 CPU features
 1 Kryo 585 Prime (Cortex-A77-based), 2.84 GHz (3.1 GHz for 865+, 3.2 GHz for 870). Prime core with 512 KB pL2
 3 Kryo 585 Gold (Cortex-A77-based), 2.42 GHz. Performance cores with 256 KB pL2 each
 4 Kryo 585 Silver (Cortex-A55-based), 1.8 GHz. Efficiency cores with 128 KB pL2 each
 DynamIQ with 4 MB sL3, 
 25% performance uplift and 25% power efficiency improvement
 3 MB system-level cache
 GPU features
Adreno 650 GPU with support for Vulkan 1.1
 50% more ALUs and ROPs
 25% faster graphics rendering and 35% more power efficient
 Quarterly GPU driver updates via Google Play Store
Android GPU Inspector Tool
 Desktop Forward Rendering
Up to 1202.1 GFLOPs FP-32 (From 898.5 GFLOPs on SD855)
 DSP features
Hexagon 698 5th generation "AI engine" capable of 15 trillion operations per second (TOPS)
 Quad-core Qualcomm Hexagon Tensor Accelerator (HTA)
 Deep learning bandwidth compression
 ISP features:
 Qualcomm Spectra 480 with dual 14-bit CV-ISPs and hardware accelerator for computer vision
Multi-frame noise reduction
Hybrid AF
 200 MP single camera; 64 MP at 30 fps single camera with MFNR/ZSL; 25 MP at 30 fps dual camera with MFNR/ZSL
 8K 30 FPS and 4K 120 FPS HDR video
 Up to 2 Gpixel/s
 Video capture formats: Dolby Vision, HDR10, HDR10+, HEVC
 Video codec support: Dolby Vision, H.265 (HEVC), HDR10+, HLG, HDR10, H.264 (AVC), VP8, VP9
 New functionalities to improve noise reduction and local contrast enhancements
 Modem and wireless features:
 External X55 LTE Modem
 Modes: NSA, SA, TDD, FDD
 5G mmWave: 800 MHz bandwidth, 8 carriers, 2×2 MIMO
 5G sub-6 GHz: 200 MHz bandwidth, 4×4 MIMO
 5G NR Sub-6 + mmWave download: 7000 Mbit/s DL
 5G NR Sub-6 + mmWave upload: 3000 Mbit/s UL
 LTE download: 2500 Mbit/s DL (Cat. 24), 7x20 MHz CA, 1024-QAM, 4x4 MIMO
 LTE upload: 316 Mbit/s UL (Cat 22), 3x20 MHz CA, 256-QAM
 Dynamic Spectrum Sharing (DSS)
 Qualcomm Wi-Fi 6-ready mobile platform:
 Qualcomm FastConnect 6800 (for 865 and 870), 6900 (for 865+)
 Wi-Fi standards: 802.11ax-ready (Wi-Fi 6E for 865+), 802.11ac Wave 2, 802.11a/b/g, 802.11n
 Wi-Fi spectral bands: 2.4 GHz, 5 GHz (for 865 and 870), 2.4 GHz, 5 GHz, 6 GHz (for 865+) • channel utilization: 20/40/80 MHz (for 865 & 870), 20/40/80/160 MHz (for 865+)
 MIMO configuration: 2x2 (2 Spatial Stream) • MU-MIMO • Dual-band simultaneous (DBS)
 Key features: 8x8 sounding (up to 2x improvement over 4x4 sounding devices), Target Wakeup Time for up to 67% better power efficiency, latest security with WPA3
 Qualcomm 60 GHz Wi-Fi mobile platform
 Wi-Fi Standards: 802.11ad, 802.11ay
 Wi-Fi spectral band: 60 GHz
 Peak speed: 10 Gbit/s
 Other features:
 Secure Processing Unit (SPU) with integrated dual-SIM dual-standby support

The Snapdragon 865+ was announced on July 8, 2020.

The Snapdragon 870 was announced on January 19, 2021.

Snapdragon 888/888+ 5G (2021) 
The Snapdragon 888 was announced on December 1, 2020.

Notable features over its predecessor (865):
 5 nm (5LPE) Samsung process
~10 billion transistors
 Support up to 16 GB LPDDR5 3200 MHz (51.2  GB/s)
 4x 16-bit memory bus
 Quick Charge 5 (100 W+)
 Support UFS 3.1
 CPU features
 1 Kryo 680 Prime (ARM Cortex-X1-based), up to 2.84 GHz. Prime core with 1 MB pL2 and 64 KB pL1
 3 Kryo 680 Gold (ARM Cortex-A78-based), up 2.42 GHz. Performance cores with 512 KB pL2 each
 4 Kryo 680 Silver (ARM Cortex-A55-based), up 1.8 GHz. Efficiency cores with 128 KB pL2 each
 Move to instruction set ARMv8.4-A (From ARMv8.2-A)
 DynamIQ with 4 MB sL3, 
 25% performance uplift and 25% power efficiency improvement
 3 MB system-level cache
  GPU features
 Adreno 660 GPU with API Support: OpenGL ES 3.2, OpenCL 2.0 FP, Vulkan 1.1
 Up to 840 MHz (From 670 MHz on 865+ and 870)
 35% faster graphics rendering and 20% more power efficient
 73% AI performance boost (From 15 TOPS to 26 TOPS)
 Variable rate shading (VRS)
 Demura and subpixel rendering for OLED uniformity
 Up to 1720.3 GFLOPs FP32 (From 1202.1 GFLOPs on SD865)
 HDR video playback formats: HDR10, HDR10+, Dolby Vision, HLG
 HDR gaming (including 10-bit color depth, Rec. 2020 color gamut)
 On-device display: 4K@60 Hz, QHD+@144 Hz
 External display: 4K@60 Hz, 10-bit, Rec. 2020, HDR10, HDR10+
 DSP features
 Hexagon 780 with Fused AI Accelerator architecture 6th generation "AI engine" capable of 26 trillion operations per second (TOPS), From 15 TOPS on 865.
 Hexagon Tensor Accelerator
 Hexagon Vector eXtensions
 Hexagon Scalar Accelerator
 Qualcomm Sensing Hub (2nd generation)
 New dedicated AI processor
 80% task reduction offload from Hexagon DSP
 5X more processing power
 16X larger shared memory
 1000X hand off time improvement in certain use cases
 50% faster scalar accelerator, 2x faster tensor accelerator 
 Video codec playback support: H.264 (AVC), H.265 (HEVC), VP8, VP9 
 ISP features:
 Qualcomm Spectra 580 with triple 14-bit CV-ISPs and hardware accelerator for computer vision
 Single camera: 1x 200 MP or 84 MP at 30 fps with MFNR/ZSL (Multi Frame Noise Reduction/Zero Shutter Lag)
 Dual camera: 64+25 MP at 30 fps with MFNR/ZSL
 Triple camera: 3x 28 MP at 30 fps with MFNR/ZSL
 8K 30 FPS and 4K 120 FPS HDR video + 64 MP Photo
 Slow-mo video capture at 720p @ 960 FPS, 1080p @ 480 FPS
 HDR video capture formats: HEVC with HDR10, HDR10+, Dolby Vision, HLG
 HDR photo capture: 10-bit HDR HEIF
 Computational HDR photo and video capture, support for Multi-Frame and Staggered HDR sensors
 Real-time object classification, segmentation, and replacement
 AI-based auto-focus, auto-exposure and auto-white-balance
 Advanced HW-based face detection with deep learning filter
 New low-light architecture (capture photos in 0.1 lux)
 2.7 Gigapixel per second ISP (+35% speed increase over S865)
 120 photos at 12MP/s
 Modem and wireless features:
 Internal X60 LTE Modem
 Modes: NSA, SA, TDD, FDD
 5G mmWave: 800 MHz bandwidth, 8 carriers, 2×2 MIMO
 5G sub-6 GHz: 200 MHz bandwidth, 4×4 MIMO
 5G NR Sub-6 + mmWave download: 7500 Mbit/s DL
 5G NR Sub-6 + mmWave upload: 3000 Mbit/s UL
 LTE download: 2500 Mbit/s DL (Cat. 24), 7x20 MHz CA, 1024-QAM, 4x4 MIMO
 LTE upload: 316 Mbit/s UL (Cat 22), 3x20 MHz CA, 256-QAM
 Dynamic Spectrum Sharing (DSS)
 Bluetooth 5.2
 Dual antennas
 Premium audio
 Qualcomm Wi-Fi 6-ready mobile platform:
 Qualcomm FastConnect 6900
 Wi-Fi standards: 802.11ax-ready (Wi-Fi 6E), 802.11ac Wave 2, 802.11a/b/g, 802.11n
 Wi-Fi spectral bands: 2.4 GHz, 5 GHz, 6 GHz • channel utilization: 20/40/80/160 MHz
 MIMO configuration: 2x2 (2 Spatial Stream) • MU-MIMO • Dual-band simultaneous (DBS) (2×2 + 2×2)
 Key features: 8x8 sounding (up to 2x improvement over 4x4 sounding devices), Target Wakeup Time for up to 67% better power efficiency, latest security with WPA3
 Qualcomm 60 GHz Wi-Fi mobile platform
 Wi-Fi Standards: 802.11ad, 802.11ay
 Wi-Fi spectral band: 60 GHz
 Peak speed: 10 Gbit/s
 Other features:
 Secure Processing Unit (SPU) with integrated dual-SIM dual-standby support
 Adds compatibility with Content Authenticity Initiative

The Snapdragon 888+ was announced on June 28, 2021.

Snapdragon 8/8+ Gen 1 (2022) 
The Snapdragon 8 Gen 1 was announced on November 30, 2021.

Notable features over its predecessor (888):
 4 nm (4LPX) Samsung process
 ~ billion transistors
 Support up to 16 GB LPDDR5 3200 MHz
 Quick Charge 5 (100 W+)
 Support UFS 3.1
 CPU features
 1 Kryo Prime (ARM Cortex-X2-based), up to 3 GHz. Prime core 
 3 Kryo Gold (ARM Cortex-A710-based), up 2.5 GHz. Performance cores 
 4 Kryo Silver (ARM Cortex-A510-based), up 1.8 GHz. Efficiency cores 
 Move to instruction set ARMv9 (From ARMv8.2-A)
 DynamIQ with 4 MB sL3, 
 20% performance uplift and 30% power efficiency improvement
 6 MB system-level cache
  GPU features
 Adreno GPU with API Support: OpenGL ES 3.2, OpenCL 2.0 FP, Vulkan 1.1
 30% faster graphics rendering and 25% more power efficient
 Demura and subpixel rendering for OLED uniformity
 Variable Rate Shading Pro
 HDR video playback formats: HDR10, HDR10+, Dolby Vision, HLG
 HDR gaming (including 10-bit color depth, Rec. 2020 color gamut)
 On-device display: 4K@60 Hz, QHD+@144 Hz
 External display: 4K@60 Hz, 10-bit, Rec. 2020, HDR10, HDR10+
 DSP features
 Hexagon with Fused AI Accelerator, INT8 and INT16 
 Hexagon Tensor Accelerator
 Hexagon Vector eXtensions
 Hexagon Scalar Accelerator
 Qualcomm Sensing Hub 
 New dedicated AI pro
 ISP features
 Qualcomm Spectra  with triple 18-bit CV-ISPs and hardware accelerator for computer vision
 Single camera: 1x 200 MP or 108 MP at 30 fps with MFNR/ZSL (Multi Frame Noise Reduction/Zero Shutter Lag)
 Dual camera: 64+36 MP at 30 fps with MFNR/ZSL
 Triple camera: 3x 36 MP at 30 fps with MFNR/ZSL
 8K 30 FPS and 4K 120 FPS HDR video + 64 MP Photo
 Slow-m 5G NR, LTE including CBRS
WCDMA, HSPA, TD-SCDMA, CDMA 1x, EV-DO, GSM/EDGE
720p @ 960 FPS
HDR video capture formats: HEVC with HDR10, HDR10+, Dolby Vision, HLG
 HDR photo capture: 10-bit HDR HEIF
 Computational HDR photo and video capture, support for Multi-Frame and Staggered HDR sensors
 Real-time object classification, segmentation, and replacement
 AI-based auto-focus, auto-exposure and auto-white-balance
 Modem and wireless features:
 Internal X65 LTE Modem
 Modes: NSA, SA, TDD, FDD
 5G mmWave
 5G sub-6 GHz
 5G NR Sub-6 + mmWave download: 10000 Mbit/s DL
 5G NR Sub-6 + mmWave upload:  Mbit/s UL
 LTE download: 
 LTE upload:
 Dynamic Spectrum Sharing (DSS)
 Bluetooth 5.3
 Qualcomm Aqstic audio codec (WCD9385)
Provide lossless wireless audio with Qualcomm aptX Technology.
 Qualcomm Wi-Fi 6-ready mobile platform:
 Qualcomm FastConnect 6900
 Wi-Fi standards: 802.11ax-ready (Wi-Fi 6E), 802.11ac Wave 2, 802.11a/b/g, 802.11n
 Wi-Fi spectral bands: 2.4 GHz, 5 GHz, 6 GHz • channel utilization: 20/40/80/160 MHz
 MIMO configuration: 2x2 (2 Spatial Stream) • MU-MIMO • Dual-band simultaneous (DBS) (2×2 + 2×2)
 Wi-Fi Standards: 802.11ad, 802.11ay
 Wi-Fi spectral band: 60 GHz
 Peak speed: 3.6 Gbit/s
The Snapdragon 8+ Gen 1 was announced on May 20, 2022.

Snapdragon 8 Gen 2 (2023) 
The Snapdragon 8 Gen 2 was announced on November 15, 2022.

Notable features over its predecessor (8 Gen 1):

 4nm (N4) TSMC process
 Support up to 16 GB LPDDR5X 4200 MHz
 Support UFS 4.0
 CPU features
 1 Kryo Prime (ARM Cortex-X3-based), up to 3.2 GHz, 3.36 GHz for Samsung Galaxy. Prime core
 1MB L2 cache
 Only 64-bit support 
 2 Kryo Gold (ARM Cortex-A715-based), up to 2.8 GHz. High Performance cores
 Only 64-bit support 
 2 Kryo Gold (ARM Cortex-A710-based), up to 2.8 GHz. Performance cores
 32-bit and 64-bit support
 3 Kryo Silver (ARM Cortex-A510-based), up to 2 GHz. Efficiency cores
 32-bit and 64-bit support
 35% performance uplift and 40% power efficiency improvement
 8 MB system-level cache
 GPU features
 Adreno GPU with API support: OpenGL ES 3.2, OpenCL 2.0, Vulkan 1.3
 25% faster graphics rendering and 45% more power efficient
 Real-time hardware-accelerated ray tracing
DSP features
 Hexagon with Fused AI Accelerator
 Hexagon Tensor Accelerator
 Hexagon Vector eXtensions
 Hexagon Scalar Accelerator
 Mixed precision INT8/INT16
 Add INT4 support 
ISP features
Video capture up to 8K30 or 4K120 or 720p960 (HDR)
Video playback up to 8K60 or 4K120 (HDR)
H.265, VP9 and add AV1 decoding 
Photo is same as 8 Gen 1
Modem and wireless features:
Internal X70 LTE Modem

Mobile Compute Platforms

Snapdragon 835 and Snapdragon 850 
The first and second generation of Qualcomm Compute Platforms for Windows PCs are based on mobile Snapdragon processors with PC specific modifications.
The Snapdragon 835 Mobile PC Platform for Windows 10 PCs was announced on December 5, 2017.
The Snapdragon 850 Mobile Compute Platform for Windows 10 PCs, was announced on June 4, 2018. It is essentially an over-clocked version of the Snapdragon 845.

Snapdragon 7c/7c+ Compute Platforms 
The Snapdragon 7c Compute Platform for Windows 10 PCs was announced on December 5, 2019.
The Snapdragon 7c Gen 2 Compute Platform was announced on May 24, 2021.
The Snapdragon 7c+ Gen 3 Compute Platform was announced on December 1, 2021.

Snapdragon 8c Compute Platforms 
The Snapdragon 8c Compute Platform for Windows 10 PCs was announced on December 5, 2019.

Snapdragon 8cx Compute Platforms 
The Snapdragon 8cx Compute Platform for Windows 10 PCs was announced on December 6, 2018.
Notable features over the Snapdragon 855:
 10 MB L3 cache
 8x 16-bit memory bus, (68.26 GB/s)
NVM Express 4x
The Snapdragon 8cx Gen 2 5G Compute Platform for Windows 10 PCs was announced on September 3, 2020.
The Snapdragon 8cx Gen 3 Compute Platform was announced on December 1, 2021.

Microsoft SQ1, SQ2 and SQ3 

The Microsoft SQ1 was announced on October 2, 2019. Co-developed with Microsoft, it was exclusively designed for Microsoft's Surface Pro X. Technically, it's a Snapdragon 8cx SoC with faster Adreno 685 GPU core providing performance of 2100 GFLOPs.
The Microsoft SQ2 was announced on October 1, 2020.

Hardware codec supported 
See: Qualcomm Hexagon

Wearable platforms

Snapdragon Wear series 
The Snapdragon Wear 1100 processor was announced May 30, 2016 for GNSS- and LTE-enabled fitness trackers and targeted purpose wearables like smart headsets, and wearable accessories.

The Snapdragon Wear 1200 processor was announced June 27, 2017 for GNSS- and LTE-narrowband-IoT-enabled targeted purpose wearables such as kid, pet, elderly, and fitness trackers.

The Snapdragon Wear 2100 processor was announced February 10, 2016 for smartwatches. It is available in both connected (4G/LTE and 3G) and tethered (Bluetooth and Wi-Fi) versions.

The Snapdragon Wear 2500 was announced on June 26, 2018. It is intended for the kid watch segment with special features over the Wear 2100 such as low-power always-on location tracking.

The Snapdragon Wear 3100 was announced on September 10, 2018. The upgrade over the Snapdragon Wear 2100 is the inclusion of the co-processor QCC1110 for low-power background applications such as heart rate tracking and always-on displays.

The Snapdragon Wear 4100 and 4100+ were announced on June 30, 2020. The difference between the two models is the inclusion of the co-processor QCC1110 in the 4100+.

The Snapdragon W5 and W5+ Gen 1 were announced on July 19, 2022. The difference between the two models is the inclusion of the co-processor QCC5100 in the W5+.

Automotive platforms

Snapdragon 602A, 820A and 855A 
The Snapdragon 602A, for application in the motor industry, was announced on January 6, 2014.
The Snapdragon 820A was announced on January 6, 2016.

Embedded platforms

Snapdragon 410E, 600E, 800, 810 and 820E 
The Snapdragon 410E Embedded and Snapdragon 600E Embedded were announced on September 28, 2016.
The Snapdragon 800 for Embedded
The Snapdragon 810 for Embedded
The Snapdragon 820E Embedded was announced on February 21, 2018.

Vision Intelligence Platform 
The Qualcomm Vision Intelligence Platform was announced on April 11, 2018. The Qualcomm Vision Intelligence Platform is purpose built to bring powerful visual computing and edge computing for machine learning to a wide range of IoT devices.

Home Hub and Smart Audio platforms

Qualcomm 212, 624 and Smart Audio 
The Qualcomm Smart Audio Platform (APQ8009 and APQ8017) was announced on June 14, 2017.
The Qualcomm 212 Home Hub (APQ8009) and Qualcomm 624 Home Hub (APQ8053) were announced on January 9, 2018.

The QCS400 Series was announced March 19, 2019.

eXtended Reality (XR) platforms

Snapdragon XR1 and XR2 
In May 2018, Qualcomm announced the Snapdragon XR1 Platform, their first purpose-built SoC for Augmented reality, Virtual reality and mixed reality. Qualcomm also announced that HTC Vive, Pico, Meta, and Vuzix would be announcing consumer products featuring the XR1 by the end of 2018.
The Snapdragon XR2 5G Platform was announced on December 5, 2019, and is a derivative of the Snapdragon 865. It is used in the Meta Quest 2, the HTC Vive Focus 3 and the Pico 4.
The Snapdragon XR2+ Gen 1 Platform was announced on October 11, 2022, and is used in the Meta Quest Pro.

Gaming platforms

Snapdragon G3x Gen 1 
In December 2021, Qualcomm announced the Snapdragon G3x Gen 1 Gaming Platform, a purpose-built SoC designed for dedicated gaming devices, derived from the Snapdragon 888+. Qualcomm also announced a handheld gaming developer kit developed with Razer. The Razer Edge is the first device to use the platform.

Specifications:
 Qualcomm Adreno GPU
 Qualcomm Kryo CPU @ 3.0 GHz
 Qualcomm Quick Game Touch
 Support for Variable Rate Shading
 Qualcomm Game Color Plus
 Qualcomm Game Smoother
 5G mmWave Modem-RF system
 Qualcomm FastConnect Subsystem with Wi-Fi 6E
 Haptics Engine
 Snapdragon Sound Technology
 4K TV out

Bluetooth SoC platforms 
Following Qualcomm's acquisition of CSR in 2015, Qualcomm designs ultra-low-power Bluetooth SoCs under the CSR, QCA and QCC brands for wireless headphones and earbuds. Qualcomm has worked with both Amazon and Google on reference designs to help manufacturers develop headsets with support for Alexa, Google Assistant and Google Fast Pair. Qualcomm announced the QCC5100 Series at CES 2018.

On January 28, 2020, the QCC304x and QCC514x SoCs were published as Bluetooth 5.2 certified by the Bluetooth SIG. On the previous day Qualcomm published a blog post on LE Audio, referring to the QCC5100 series. On March 25, 2020, the BLE Audio QCC304x and QCC514x SoCs were officially announced.

Qualcomm QCC300x Series Bluetooth audio SoCs

Qualcomm QCC30xx Series Bluetooth audio SoCs

Qualcomm QCC510x Series Bluetooth audio SoCs

See also 
 List of devices using Qualcomm Snapdragon systems on chips
 Qualcomm Adreno
 Qualcomm Hexagon
 List of Qualcomm Snapdragon modems
 Apple M1
 Tegra
 Exynos
 HiSilicon
 List of MediaTek systems on chips
 List of UNISOC systems on chips

References

External links 
 
 , product page

ARM-based systems on chips
Qualcomm